Smaller and Smaller Circles is a 2017 Philippine mystery drama film directed by Raya Martin with a screenplay by Ria Limjap and Moira Lang, based on the 2002 novel of the same name by F. H. Batacan. The film stars Nonie Buencamino and Sid Lucero as Jesuit priests and forensic investigators Gus Saenz and Jerome Lucero, Carla Humphries as journalist Joanna Bonifacio, with Gladys Reyes, Ricky Davao, Bembol Roco, TJ Trinidad, Christopher De Leon and Tessie Tomas in supporting roles.

This is also the last film appearance of comedienne Joy Viado, who died of a heart attack in Quezon City, Diliman on September 10, 2016 at the age of 57.

Synopsis
Two Jesuit priests, Gus Saenz and Jerome Lucero perform forensic work to solve the mystery revolving around the murders of young boys in Payatas, one of Metro Manila's biggest slum areas. While dealing with the systematic corruption of the government, church, and the elite, the two priests delve into criminal profiling, crime scene investigation, and forensic analysis to solve the killings, and eventually, find the murderer.

Cast
 Nonie Buencamino as Father Augusto Saenz, SJ
 Sid Lucero as Father Jerome Lucero, SJ
 Carla Humphries as Joanna Bonifacio
 Jun-jun Quintana as Dr. Alex Carlos
 Gladys Reyes as Hon. Tess Mariano
 Ricky Davao as Cardinal Rafael Meneses
 Bembol Roco as NBI Deputy Director Francisco Lastimosa
 Christopher De Leon as NBI Deputy Director Phillip Mapa
 TJ Trinidad as Deputy Jake Valdez
 Tessie Tomas as Gilda Salceda
 Alex Medina as Carding
 Joy Viado as Assistant to Atty. Arcinas

Production
Several scenes in the film were shot on location at the Ateneo de Manila University.

Release
The film debuted in theaters in the Philippines on December 6, 2017. The film was made available on YouTube starting May 20, 2020.

References

External links
 
 

2017 crime drama films
2010s mystery drama films
Philippine crime drama films
Philippine mystery films
Philippine detective films
Films set in the Philippines
Films set in Manila
Films based on crime novels
Films about murder
Films based on Philippine novels
Films directed by Raya Martin